Emily Roughan (born 30 October 1993) is a New Zealand long-distance runner. In 2019, she competed in the senior women's race at the 2019 IAAF World Cross Country Championships held in Aarhus, Denmark. She finished in 83rd place.

References

External links 
 

Living people
1993 births
Place of birth missing (living people)
New Zealand female long-distance runners
New Zealand female cross country runners
21st-century New Zealand women